Piet Pretorius was the deputy speaker of the Western Cape Provincial Parliament, South Africa. He is a member of the governing Democratic Alliance.

References

External links
 

Year of birth missing (living people)
Living people
Democratic Alliance (South Africa) politicians
Members of the Western Cape Provincial Parliament